The Catalina Island leaf-toed gecko (Phyllodactylus bugastrolepis) is a species of gecko. It is endemic to Isla Santa Catalina in Gulf of California, Mexico.

References

Phyllodactylus
Endemic reptiles of Mexico
Reptiles described in 1966